The FIBA U20 Women's European Championship, is a basketball competition inaugurated in 2000. Until 2004 it was held biannually, but from 2005 onwards it is held every year. The current champions are Spain.

Division A

Results

Medal table

Participation details

Overall win–loss record

Participations up to 2022, wins/losses up to 2022.
In bold, qualified for the 2023 edition.

Top scorers (points per game)
Here is a list of all Top Scorers of each edition.

Division B

Results

* Since 2012, the 3rd team in Division B is also promoted to Division A for the next tournament.

Medal table

See also 
 EuroBasket Women
 FIBA U18 Women's European Championship
 FIBA U16 Women's European Championship

References

Archive FIBA

External links
 Official site

 
Recurring sporting events established in 2000
Women's basketball competitions in Europe between national teams
Europe